Sodium pentaborate, more properly disodium decaborate, is a chemical compound of sodium, boron, and oxygen; a salt with elemental formula , , or .  It is a colorless crystalline solid, soluble in water.

This formula is often misleading as some of the water molecules are actually hydroxyl groups covalently attached to boron atoms.  

The compound is used in agriculture as a boron supplement in fertilizer with various trade names such as Solubor and Aquabor. It has also been tested as an additive to improve plasma electrolytic oxidation of magnesium alloys.

The name "sodium pentaborate" has also been used for a distinct compound with formula , better called trisodium pentaborate.

Structure and preparation

Dihydrate
The latter seems more likely, since under thermogravimetric analysis the material starts to decompose at about 130 °C with partial loss of water. 

It can be prepared by reacting water solutions of sodium carbonate  and boric acid  in mole ratio 1:10 and evaporating the resulting solution at 40 °C. It belongs to the monoclinic crystal system with symmetry group P21/c (C2h5) and parameters a = 1110.3 pm, b = 1643.7 pm, c = 1356.4 pm, α = 89.960°, β = 112.850° and γ = 89.9°, formulas per cell Z = 4.

References

Borates